Bernardo Añor Acosta (born May 24, 1988) is a Venezuelan footballer who plays as a defender or a midfielder.

Career

College and amateur
During the 2010 collegiate off-season Añor was on the roster of the Bradenton Academics in the USL Premier Development League, but never actually saw any minutes with the team.

Professional
On January 14, 2011, Añor was drafted in the third round (48th overall) in the 2011 MLS SuperDraft by Columbus Crew. He made his professional debut on March 26, 2011, in a 0-0 tie with the New York Red Bulls, and scored his first professional goal on June 18 in a 2-0 win over Houston Dynamo and for his actions on field, earned MLS Player of the Week honors in the process.

Añor was traded to Sporting Kansas City on December 8, 2014.

Añor spent the 2016 season on loan with NASL side Minnesota United FC. It was announced on January 24, 2017 that Añor had signed with Minnesota United FC as the team built its roster for its first Major League Soccer season.

International
Añor is an experienced youth international, having represented Venezuela at U-15 and U-20 levels. He made his debut for the senior squad on 16 November 2018 in a friendly against Japan as a 74th-minute substitute for Luis Mago.

Personal
Bernardo's father, also named Bernardo Añor, was a professional soccer player in Venezuela. His younger brother Juanpi is also a footballer.

References

External links
 
 USF profile
 
 

1988 births
Living people
Columbus Crew draft picks
Columbus Crew players
Expatriate soccer players in the United States
IMG Academy Bradenton players
Minnesota United FC (2010–2016) players
Minnesota United FC players
Major League Soccer players
North American Soccer League players
South Florida Bulls men's soccer players
Sporting Kansas City players
Footballers from Caracas
Caracas FC players
Venezuelan expatriate footballers
Venezuelan expatriate sportspeople in the United States
Venezuelan footballers
Venezuela international footballers
Association football midfielders